Grammatical particles, or simply particles, are words that convey certain grammatical meanings. The term is often applied to words that are difficult to classify according to traditional grammar. Both Classical Chinese and Modern Standard Chinese make use of particles. They belong to function words. In other words, they have no lexical meaning, but are used to indicate certain grammatical information. This contrasts with content words. Particles in Chinese usually take the neutral tone.: p. 238

Studies by earlier authors
The first book devoted to the study of Chinese particles, was written by Lu Yi-Wei in the period of the Yuan Dynasty (1271–1368). These works focus on particles in the Confucius classics. Particles used in the vernacular literature did not draw much attention. The first work covering the particles found in the vernacular literature,  (Compilation and Explanations of the Colloquial Terms Found in Classical Poetry and Operas) by Zhang Xiang, appeared posthumously in 1953.

Linguistic sketch
Linguists often categorise Chinese particles into the following types:
Structural particle: This class of particles concern syntactic relations. The particles can be distinguished only in written form because they are usually pronounced the same.
 is used to mark adverbials. E.g.:  (ānjìng dì/de shuì zháo le) 'fell asleep quietly'
 is used to mark verb complements. E.g.:  (xuéxí dé/de hěn rènzhēn) 'study very hard'
, according to traditional analysis, is used to mark attributive. It is often analysed as a nominaliser. E.g.:  (shū dè/de fēngmiàn hěn piàoliang) '(the) cover of the book (is) very beautiful'

Aspectual particle: Commonly dubbed aspect markers ( or ), the particles signal grammatical aspect. The most renowned ones are the perfective , durative , durative , and experiential .: p. 185

Modal particle: Often called sentence-final particles, the particles signal linguistic modality.

Particles like  and  remain disputable since no satisfactory analysis is present.

Illustrations

In Classical Chinese
The function of a Chinese particle depends on its position in the sentence and on context. In many cases, the character used for a particle is a phonetic loan; therefore, the same particle could be written with different characters that share the same sound. For example, qí/jī (which originally represented the word jī "winnowing basket", now represented by the character ), a common particle in classical Chinese, has, among others, various meaning as listed below.

The following list provides examples of the functions of particles in Classical Chinese. Classical Chinese refers to the traditional style of written Chinese that is modelled on the Classics, such as Confucius's Analects. Thus, its usage of particles differs from that of modern varieties of Chinese.

In Modern Varieties of Chinese

Baihua
Written vernacular Chinese, refers to written Chinese that is based on the vernacular language used during the period between imperial China and the early 20th century. The use of particles in vernacular Chinese differs from that of Classical Chinese, as can be seen in the following examples. Usage of particles in modern Standard Chinese is similar to that illustrated here.

Min Chinese

Hakka Chinese

Yue Chinese

See also

Chinese exclamative particles
Chinese pronouns
Chinese adjectives
Chinese verbs
Chinese grammar
Classical Chinese grammar
Okinawan particles
Japanese particles
Korean particles

References
 Note that particles are different from zhùdòngcí (助動詞; modal verbs or modal auxiliaries) in Chinese.

Further reading
Dobson, W. A. C. H. (1974). A Dictionary of the Chinese Particles. Toronto: University of Toronto Press.
He Jiuying 何九盈 (1995). Zhongguo gudai yuyanxue shi (中囯古代语言学史 "A history of ancient Chinese linguistics"). Guangzhou: Guangdong jiaoyu chubanshe.
Wang Li 王力 (ed.) (2000). Wang Li guhanyu zidian (王力古漢語字典 "A character dictionary of classical Chinese, chiefly edited by Wang Li"). Beijing: Zhonghua Book Company.
Yip, Po-Ching & Don, Rimmington. (2004). Chinese: A Comprehensive Grammar. London; New York: Routledge.

Particles